Toni Andreas Leistner (born 19 August 1990) is a German professional footballer who plays as a centre-back for Belgian First Division A club Sint-Truiden.

Career
Leistner began his career with Dynamo Dresden, who he joined in 2010 from Borea Dresden, primarily as a reserve-team player. After a few appearances on the bench he made his first-team debut in April 2011, when he replaced Florian Jungwirth in a 3. Liga match against SpVgg Unterhaching. Dynamo were promoted at the end of the 2010–11 season, and Leistner made three appearances in the 2. Bundesliga the following year. In January 2013 he signed for Hallescher FC on a six-month loan. He returned to Dynamo for the 2013–14 season, and became a first-team regular after the winter break, but was unable to prevent the club being relegated to the 3. Liga. At the end of the season, he signed for Union Berlin.

Queens Park Rangers
On 1 July 2018, Leistner signed for Queens Park Rangers on a three-year deal following the expiry of his contract in Germany. He scored his first goal for the club in a 1–0 win against Reading on 2 October 2018.

Leistner was ever-present in the Rangers defense in his first season at the club, appearing 45 times in all competitions.

After being in and out of team under by new manager Mark Warburton on 30 January 2020, Leistner was loaned out to 1. FC Köln until the end of the 2019–20 season.

On 28 August 2020, Leistner had his contract terminated by mutual consent. The same day he became a new Hamburger SV player.

Personal life
During the COVID-19 pandemic in spring 2020, Leistner donated one-month salary to his youth team SC Borea Dresden.

Career statistics

References

External links

Living people
1990 births
Association football defenders
German footballers
German expatriate footballers
Dynamo Dresden players
Dynamo Dresden II players
Hallescher FC players
1. FC Union Berlin players
Queens Park Rangers F.C. players
1. FC Köln players
Hamburger SV players
Sint-Truidense V.V. players
Bundesliga players
2. Bundesliga players
3. Liga players
Expatriate footballers in England
English Football League players
Belgian Pro League players
Footballers from Dresden